The 1996 Waveney District Council election took place on 7 May 1996 to elect members of Waveney District Council in England. This was on the same day as other local elections.

Summary

Ward results

Beccles Town

Beccles Worlingham

Bungay

Carlton

Carlton Colville

Gunton

Halesworth

Harbour

Kessingland

Kirkley

Normanston

Oulton Broad

Pakefield

Southwold

St. Margaret's

Whitton

References

1996 English local elections
May 1996 events in the United Kingdom
1996
1990s in Suffolk